In chemistry, ethanium or protonated ethane is a highly reactive positive ion with formula . It can be described as a molecule of ethane with one extra proton (hydrogen nucleus), that gives it a +1 electric charge.

Ethanium is one of the simplest carbonium ions (after methanium ).  It was first detected as a rarefied gas in 1960 by S. Wexler and N. Jesse.  It easily dissociates into ethenium  and molecular hydrogen .

Production
Ethanium was first detected by infrared spectroscopy among the ions produced by electrical discharges in rarefied methane or ethane gas.

Ethanium can also be produced by irradiating methane containing traces of ethane with an electron beam at low pressure (about 2 mmHg). The electron beam first creates methanium and methenium ions. The former rapidly transfer their proton to ethane:
 +  →  + 
The latter reaction is also observed when ,  or  ions are injected into ethane at somewhat lower pressure.

Stability and reactions

Structure
Like its "unsaturated" relatives ethenium and ethynium , the ethanium ion was conjectured to have (at least momentarily) a proton bound simultaneously to the two carbon atoms, and the electrical charge evenly spread between them, as in other non-classical ions.  The alternative "classical" structure would have the charge and the extra hydrogen bound to only one of the two atoms, i.e. a methylated methanium ion.

Earlier calculations had predicted that the energies of the two forms should be 4 to 12 kcal/mol lower than the dissociated state  + , and they should be separated by a slightly positive energy barrier.  Gas-phase infrared spectroscopy by Yeh and others (1989) has shown that both forms are stable.  The bridged structure has the lowest energy, 4 to 8 kcal/mol lower than the classical one.

Refined calculations by Obata and Hirao (1993) predict that the most stable form has three orthogonal planes of symmetry (C2v) with the two  subgroups in the eclipsed configuration (unlike ethane, whose ground state has the staggered configuration). Four "bottom" H atoms lie on a plane opposite to the bridging H atom and the other two "top" H atoms. The approximate computed distances are C–C 0.211 nm, C–H 0.124 nm (bridging), 0.107 nm (bottom) and 0.108 nm (top); the C–H–C angle at the bridge is about 116 degrees, the H–C–H angles are 116 degrees (bottom-bottom) and 114 degrees (bottom-top).  However, there are other configurations with near-minimum energy, including one where the two  subgroups are slightly staggered (with Cs symmetry), another where one of the carbons of a  ion is loosely bound to an  molecule 0.250 nm away.

See also
 Doubly protonated ethane

References
 

Carbocations